The Place du Tertre is a square in the 18th arrondissement of Paris, France. Only a few streets away from Montmartre's Basilica of the Sacré Cœur and the Lapin Agile, it is near the summit of the city's elevated Montmartre quarter. Place du Tertre was the heart of the prestigious Benedictine Montmartre Abbey, established in 1133 by King Louis VI. Montmartre Abbey thrived through the centuries and until the French revolution under the patronage of the Kings of France. Place du Tertre was opened to the public in 1635 as Montmartre village central square. From the end of the 18th century until World War One, the whole Montmartre Boheme could be seen here: painters, songwriters and poets.

With its many artists setting up their easels each day for the tourists, the Place du Tertre is a reminder of the time when Montmartre was the mecca of modern art. At the beginning of the 20th century, many painters including Pablo Picasso, Amedeo Modigliani, and Maurice Utrillo were living there, some at the nearby Le Bateau-Lavoir. The Musée de Montmartre, the former home and studio of Pierre-Auguste Renoir and Suzanne Valadon, and the L'Espace Salvador Dalí, a museum principally dedicated to the sculpture and drawings of Salvador Dalí, can be found near Place du Tertre.

References

External links
Satellite image from Google Maps
Virtual tour 360 degrees: use the mouse to turn around

Tertre, place du
Montmartre
Buildings and structures in the 18th arrondissement of Paris